"Let's Go Home Together" is a song by English singer and songwriter Ella Henderson and English singer and songwriter Tom Grennan. It was released as a digital download and for streaming on 19 February 2021. The song was released as the lead single from Henderson's second studio album Everything I Didn't Say and is also featured on the deluxe edition of Grennan's second studio album Evering Road.

The song was a commercial success; it peaked at number 10 on the UK singles chart becoming Henderson's fifth top ten and Grennan's second top 10. Elsewhere it peaked at number 11 on Irish singles chart. "Let's Go Home Together" peaked inside the top 40 on the 2021 year end chart in the UK at number 25 and in Ireland at number 38 respectively. It has since been certified Platinum for shipping 600,000 combined units and sales in the United Kingdom. It was also nominated for Best Song Musically and Lyrically at the 2022 Ivor Novello Awards.

Background
Talking about the song and the collaboration, Henderson said, "This song has always been so special to me that I kept going back to it. Tom and I have been friends for years, I love his voice and I’m so happy we got to do this together." Grennan said, "When Ella hit me up and played me this song and then asked me to join her on it, I was absolutely buzzin’. Ella is a good mate of mine and it's so sick to finally get to sing together!"

Reception
In April 2022, "Let's Go Home Together" was nominated for an Ivor Novello Award for the Best Song Musically and Lyrically at the 2022 Ivor Novello Awards.

Music video
A music video to accompany the release of "Let's Go Home Together" was first released onto YouTube on 25 February 2021. The video was directed by Michael Holyk and shows Henderson and Grennan at the pub with their own group of friends.

Live performances
On 20 February 2021, they performed the song live on The Graham Norton Show. On 26 March 2021, they performed the song live on The One Show.

Track listing

Personnel and credits
Credits adapted from Tidal and album booklet.

Recording locations

The MixSuite (Los Angeles)
The Music Shed (UK)
RAK Studios (UK) – Tom Grennan's vocals
The Church (UK) – Tom Grennan's vocals
Wired Masters (UK)

Personnel

 Vern Asbury – guitar
 Tom "Froe" Barnes – drums
Chris Bishop - assistant engineer
Kevin Grainger - mastering
Ollie Green - vocal producer (for Tom Grennan)
Tom Grennan - background vocals
Ella Henderson - lead vocals
 Peter "Merf" Kelleher – synths
Sam Klempner - assistant engineer
Benjamin Kohn - piano
Mark "Spike Strent" - audio mixer
 TMS – producer, engineer
Matt Wollach - assistant audio mixer

Charts

Weekly charts

Year-end charts

Certifications

Release history

References

2021 songs
2021 singles
Tom Grennan songs
Asylum Records singles
Ella Henderson songs
Songs written by Ella Henderson
Songs written by James Arthur
Songs written by Peter Kelleher (songwriter)
Songs written by Ben Kohn
Songs written by Tom Barnes (songwriter)
Song recordings produced by TMS (production team)